Greg Fox may refer to:
Greg Fox (ice hockey) (born 1953), retired Canadian ice hockey defenceman
Greg Fox (cartoonist) (born 1961), American creator of Kyle's Bed & Breakfast
Greg Fox, drummer for Liturgy